Dean McGilvray is an English rugby league footballer who plays for Leigh Centurions in the Co-Operative Championship. A diminutive , he made his début for St. Helens in 2006 against the Catalans Dragons.

McGilvray joined Super League side Salford City Reds for the 2009 season.
McGilvray has since signed for the Leigh Centurions for their 2011 campaign in the Co-operative Championship, winning the Northern Rail Cup in his first season in a 20-16 win over Halifax at Bloomfield Road. In August 2019, Dean married Alexa Baur.

References

External links
Saints profile
Saints Heritage Society profile
Dean McGilvray - SL Stats

1988 births
Living people
English rugby league players
Leigh Leopards players
Rugby league fullbacks
Rugby league players from St Helens, Merseyside
Rugby league wingers
Salford Red Devils players
St Helens R.F.C. players